Sagamore is an unincorporated community in Fayette County, Pennsylvania, United States.

Notes

Unincorporated communities in Fayette County, Pennsylvania
Unincorporated communities in Pennsylvania